Cornuta is an extinct order of echinoderms.  Along with the mitrates, they form one half of the Stylophora.

References

External links 
 
 
 Cornuta at fossilworks.org (retrieved 16 April 2016)

Homalozoa
Prehistoric animal orders
Echinoderm orders